Amandinea clandestinus is a species of crustose lichen in the family Caliciaceae, and found in New South Wales. It was first described in 2013 by Australian lichenologists Jack Elix and Gintaras Kantvilas from a specimen collected on coastal rocks at Jervis Bay, New South Wales.

References

clandestinus
Lichen species
Lichens of Australia
Taxa named by John Alan Elix
Taxa named by Gintaras Kantvilas
Lichens described in 2013